The Dali–Lijiang railway or Dali railway, is a single-track electrified railroad in Yunnan Province of Southwest China.  The line runs   from Dali to Lijiang and was built from 2004 to 2009.  Bridges and tunnels account  of the total length of the line.  The trip by train between the two cities takes 1.5 hours compared to four hours by bus., with maximum rated speed at 140 km/h

On October 30, 2011, the Dali–Lijiang railway was extended northward by 16-km after the Renhe-Lijiang (Renli) rail extension was completed.  The Renli section begins from Renhe station, near Renhe village in Qihe Township of Old Town Lijiang, and runs north to the newly built Lijiang railway station.  The new Lijiang station is the second largest passenger railway station in Yunnan and will serve as the southern terminus of the Lijiang–Shangri-La railway.

Rail connections

Dali: Guangtong–Dali railway, Dali–Lincang railway, Dali–Ruili railway
Lijiang: Lijiang–Shangri-La railway (under construction)

See also

 List of railways in China

References

Railway lines in China
Rail transport in Yunnan
Railway lines opened in 2009